The Cathedral of Saint Mary of the Immaculate Conception is the cathedral of the Roman Catholic Diocese of Lafayette in Indiana. It is located at 1207 Columbia Street in Lafayette, Indiana. It is also a contributing property in the St. Mary Historic District.

History
The congregation began in 1843 when a small group of Irish Catholic families in the area met for Mass in rented space.  By the following year, they raised enough money to construct their own building.  The brick Church of Sts. Mary and Martha stood at the intersection of Fifth and Brown Streets and was completed in 1846.  In 1850, a school was constructed on adjacent land which came under the administration of the Oblate Sisters of Providence in 1858.

In 1860, parishioner Lawrence Stockton donated a plot of land on Columbia Street to the Reverend Edmund Kilroy for construction of a church, rectory, and school. Preliminary work began shortly thereafter, but stopped when the Civil War began in April 1861.

The Reverend George Hamilton replaced Father Kilroy as pastor and oversaw completion of construction. The Gothic-style church was dedicated August 15, 1866. The interior is divided into three naves by columns. The frescos and the stained glass windows were installed in 1887. The exterior was originally brick, but it was covered in 1904 with concrete to resemble stone. That same year, the front staircase and the balustrade were also completed.

In 1944, the Diocese of Lafayette-in-Indiana was created by dividing the Diocese of Fort Wayne and St. Mary's Church was chosen as the cathedral for the new diocese. The cathedral has undergone a number of changes including an interior redecoration and addition of a social hall in 2001.

See also
List of Catholic cathedrals in the United States
List of cathedrals in the United States
St. Mary Historic District

References

External links
Cathedral Website
Diocese of Lafayette in Indiana Website
Interior photo of Saint Mary

Religious organizations established in 1843
Roman Catholic churches completed in 1866
History of Catholicism in Indiana
Churches in Lafayette, Indiana
Mary of the Immaculate Conception, Cathedral of Saint
Tourist attractions in Tippecanoe County, Indiana
Roman Catholic Diocese of Lafayette in Indiana
Gothic Revival church buildings in Indiana
National Register of Historic Places in Tippecanoe County, Indiana
Historic district contributing properties in Indiana
19th-century Roman Catholic church buildings in the United States